The Hae Hae Te Moana River is a river in the Canterbury region of New Zealand. It originates in the Four Peaks Range of the Southern Alps, with a North Branch and South Branch merging to the north of Pleasant Valley. The river runs south-east to join the Waihi River near Winchester. The combined river is called the Temuka River, which flows past Temuka to join the Opihi River shortly before it runs into the Canterbury Bight.

See also
List of rivers of New Zealand

References

Land Information New Zealand - Search for Place Names

Rivers of Canterbury, New Zealand
Rivers of New Zealand